Prill is a German surname. Notable people with the surname include:

  (born 1930), German actress
 David Prill (born 1959), American author
 Sondra Prill (born 1970), American cover singer

German-language surnames